Inch by Inch is a 1960 picture book written and illustrated by Leo Lionni. The book tells the story of an inchworm who likes to measure everything. The book was a recipient of a 1961 Caldecott Honor for its illustrations.

The original version of Inch by Inch had no page numbers. This book was also published by Astor-Honor and Scholastic Book Services in 1960; most of these version had page numbers and 26 pages.

Adaptation into film
In 2006, Weston Woods Studios adapted Inch by Inch into an animated film narrated by Ron McLarty. It was an ALA Notable Recording in 2007.

External links
 https://archive.org/details/inchbyinch00lion - March 1994 reprint
 https://openlibrary.org/works/OL2162568W/Inch_by_inch

References

1960 children's books
American picture books
Caldecott Honor-winning works